Shawn Graham (born 26 October 1977) is a Barbadian cricketer. He played in six first-class and four List A matches for the Barbados cricket team from 1999 to 2005.

See also
 List of Barbadian representative cricketers

References

External links
 

1977 births
Living people
Barbadian cricketers
Barbados cricketers
People from Saint George, Barbados